The Ulster Medical Society was formed in Belfast, County Antrim, Ireland, in 1862 through the amalgamation of two older societies, the Belfast Medical Society which was founded in 1806, and the Belfast Clinical and Pathological Society which was founded in 1853.

The UMS publishes a quarterly journal, Ulster Medical Journal, available free on the Society's internet site.

References

Further reading 
   (Fraser attempted to get this into the UMJ in 1985, but it was rejected by the editor.  The manuscript remains, however.)

External links 
 Society website

Medical associations based in the United Kingdom
Organizations established in 1862
Medical and health organisations based in Northern Ireland
1862 establishments in Ireland